Elections were held in Slovakia's eight self-governing regions on 9 November 2013. Elected were Regional Governors and City Councilors.

It was held on basis of 2 rounds if candidate haven't gained 50% of votes, if he gained the required percents, there would not be runoff.
Only three candidates got elected in the first round, in Prešov, Žilina, and Trenčín Regions. There was runoff in Košice, Banská Bystrica, Nitra, Trnava, and Bratislava Regions.

Six of the regional presidencies were won by centre-left Direction – Social Democracy (Smer), with Bratislava Region being carried on by incumbent Governor Pavol Frešo of Slovak Democratic and Christian Union – Democratic Party. The biggest surprise came in Banská Bystrica Region, where leader of the far-right People's Party – Our Slovakia, Marian Kotleba, got to the second round of elections to face off with incumbent Governor Vladimír Maňka of Smer. He then defeated Vladimír Maňka in the second round and won the runoff by 55,5 % (71 397 Regional votes) and became Governor of Banská Bystrica Region, and also ended as candidate with most votes to City Council of Banská Bystrica (8678 votes).

Results

Presidencies

Councils

References

Elections in Slovakia
2013 elections in Europe
November 2013 events in Europe
2013 in Slovakia
Regional elections in Slovakia